Yuriy Yaroslavovych Mokrytskyi (born 16 October 1970 in Rava-Ruska) is a former Ukrainian football player.

Honours
Soviet Union
FIFA U-17 World Cup champion: 1987
UEFA European Under-16 Championship runner-up: 1987

Karpaty Lviv
Ukrainian Cup finalist: 1993

References

External links
 

1970 births
People from Rava-Ruska
Living people
Soviet footballers
FC SKA-Karpaty Lviv players
FC Karpaty Lviv players
FC Halychyna Drohobych players
Ukrainian footballers
Soviet First League players
Soviet Second League players
Ukrainian Premier League players
Ukrainian First League players
Ukrainian Second League players
Maccabi Ironi Ashdod F.C. players
Ukrainian expatriate footballers
Expatriate footballers in Israel
FC Zhemchuzhina Sochi players
Russian Premier League players
Expatriate footballers in Russia
FC Vorskla Poltava players
FC Vorskla-2 Poltava players
FC Prykarpattia Ivano-Frankivsk (2004) players
FC Oleksandriya players
FC Nyva Vinnytsia players
FC Tekhno-Centre Rohatyn players
FC Dnipro Cherkasy players
Association football defenders
Sportspeople from Lviv Oblast